Automotive Energy Supply Corporation (AESC) is a manufacturer of lithium ion batteries for electric vehicles established 2007 as a joint venture between Nissan, NEC and Tokin Corporation.

History
In 2007 NEC Corporation, Nissan Motor Company, and NEC Tokin agreed to establish a lithium-ion battery company focused on development to production of batteries for electric vehicles; in 2008 the company was established with a capital of ¥1.5 billion ($14.3million) with a 51:42:7 Nissan:NEC:NEC TOKIN shareholding; the business was to establish a manufacturing site at Nissan's facility in Zama, Kanagawa  c.2009, with an initial capacity of 13,000 units per year, rising to 65,000 units per year on an investment of ¥12 billion ($114.6 million). The plant was to be supplied with lithium manganese electrode from NEC TOKIN's factory in Sagamihara, Kanagawa; itself upgraded at a cost of ¥11 billion  ($128million). Initial markets were to be forklift trucks, followed by electric and hybrid vehicles manufactured by Nissan.

Initial production of the Lithium Manganese Oxide battery (LiMn 2O4) LMO was based on a manganese spinel cathode, with batteries formed from laminated cells. The  battery  (L3-10) was a  unit of 13Ah, 3.6V  with a power density of 2060W/kg (2.5V @ 20 °C).

In late 2008 the joint owners announced they were investing a further ¥100 billion ($1.1 billion) in AESC, establishing an additional factory to increase capacity for around 200,000 vehicles per year.
Trial production at Zama began mid 2009.

In 2010 the Nissan Leaf electric vehicle began production, using batteries from AESC.

In 2014 AESC was the second largest electric vehicle battery manufacturer worldwide (after Panasonic), with 21% of the market. In late 2014 Reuters reported conflict within the Nissan / Renault carmaker alliance over sourcing of battery packs for its Nissan Motor Manufacturing UK and Nissan Smyrna Assembly Plant (USA) car battery plants due to lack of price competitiveness with rival cell manufacturer LG Chem - Nissan was reported to have signed contracts to take all of NEC's electrode production, irrespective of sales.

In 2016, Nissan decided to sell its 51% stake in AESC, preferring external suppliers. In December, 2016 Carlos Ghosn explains that being tied to internal battery manufacturing does not allow for the flexibility of buying cheaper third party batteries.

In mid 2017 Nissan announced it was to sell its battery businesses including AESC (including acquiring the 49% NEC stake) to Chinese investment company GSR Capital for ~$1 billion. However, this sale did not actually happen and after three delays was canceled in July 2018 as intended buyer GSR Capital did not complete funding for the sale.

In Aug 2018, Nissan announced sale of its electric car battery unit to Chinese renewable group Envision Group, while retaining a 25% stake. The sale included AESC as well as battery manufacturing plants in USA (Tennessee) and England (Sunderland 1.9 GWh capacity). NEC's 49% stake was also to be sold to Envision.

In April 2019 the company, announced plans to open a new 20GWh capacity battery plant in Wuxi, Jiangsu, China, roughly triple its production capacity of 7.5GWh/pa.

A new EV 9 GWh factory will be built in Sunderland by Envision AESC. The formal planning process is about to begin for the new gigafactory, which represents an initial 9GWh plant, with potential future-phase investment of £1.8bn by Envision AESC generating up to 25GWh and creating 4,500 new high-value green jobs in the region by 2030, with potential on site for up to 35GWh.

Renault and Envision AESC confirmed in June 2021 the plan to set up a €2 billion ($2.4 billion) gigafactory in Douai, Northern France close to Renault ElectriCity which would supply Renault Group with 9 GWh of EV batteries by 2024 and 24 GWh of batteries by 2030

Gallery

References

Lithium-ion batteries
Electric vehicle battery manufacturers
Nissan
Joint ventures
Companies based in Kanagawa Prefecture
Manufacturing companies of Japan